Kathleen Shannon  (November 11, 1935 – January 9, 1998) was a Canadian film director and producer. She is best known as the founder and first executive producer of Studio D of the National Film Board of Canada, the first government-funded film studio in the world dedicated to women filmmakers.

Career

Early career 
Shannon began her career in the Canadian film industry cataloging music for Crawley Films in Ottawa after dropping out of high school at the age of 16. She later joined the National Film Board (NFB) as an  editor in 1956 when she was 21. In her early years at the NFB Shannon worked as a sound, music, and picture editor. After Shannon had some 200 films to her credit as an editor she directed her first film, Goldwood in 1970. Goldwood was based on her childhood memories of one of the mining towns in Northern British Columbia where her father, a mining engineer, had worked.

From 1974 to 1975, Shannon produced and directed eleven short films that made up the Working Mothers film series. The films delve into the experiences of working mother's throughout Canada, with some of the films focused on an individual women, including Our Dear Sisters, whose subject was Indigenous filmmaker Alanis Obomsawin. The series was created as part of the NFB's Challenge for Change Program (1967-1980), which was a government funded initiative to bring the art and practice of film making to communities across Canada in an effort to incite social change. Initially meant to be one film, Shannon and distributive consultant Doris Mae Oulton proposed a format change of several short films and held small test screenings across different communities to try convince the NFB and the projects federal government sponsor of the new format's potential for success. With the new format approved, the Working Mother's series became arguably one of the most important achievements of Challenge for Change, and its success paved the way for Shannon's proposal for a women's studio within the NFB.

Studio D 
Shannon was the driving force behind the creation of Studio D. She lobbied the unenthusiastic NFB to create a women's film production unit that would produce feminist documentaries created by and for women. When the studio was launched in 1974, it was housed in the basement of the NFB headquarters in Montreal with a budget of $100,000 and three women on staff; Shannon, Margaret Pettigrew, and Yuki Yoshida.  Shannon became the first executive producer and remained in the role for 12 years before stepping down in June 1986.

In an interview with The Christian Science Monitor, Shannon outlined in what her opinion was the five objectives of Studio D: "providing employment opportunities for women, providing training opportunities for women, meeting the information needs of women, creating an environment that would facilitate 'exploring our creativity in our own way', [and] bringing the perspective of women to bear 'on all social issues.'"

While executive producer, Shannon oversaw the creation and production of over 80 films, including Not a Love Story: A Film About Pornography (1981), and the Academy Award-winning documentaries I'll Find a Way (1977) and If You Love This Planet (1982).

Legacy 
In 1996, Studio D was closed due to decreased government funding and NFB layoffs. One of the last films produced by Studio D before it was shut down was a biographical documentary about Shannon entitled Kathleen Shannon: On Film, Feminism, and Other Dreams, directed by Gerry Rogers. The film includes personal interviews with Shannon as well as archival footage and photography. In the film Shannon reflects on various topics: from childhood, aging, and alcoholism, to the work-life balance, and her experiences during her time at the NFB and Studio D.

The NFB also established a documentary prize in Shannon's name, the "Kathleen Shannon Award" which is awarded annually at the Yorkton Short Film and Video Festival.

Personal life 
Shannon was married twice and had one son. After Shannon retired, she moved to the Kootenays where she opened a guest house for women and worked as a therapist.

In 1986, Shannon was awarded the Order of Canada because, "Under her leadership, the National Film Board's Studio D - which she founded in 1974 - succeeded in producing award-winning socially and culturally committed films which have made Canada and the studio internationally known for the excellence and relevance of its work." Shannon was also bestowed three honorary degrees: a Doctor of Laws from Queen's University in 1984, a Doctor of Letters from York University in 1996, and a Doctor of Humane Letters from Mount Saint Vincent University in 1997.

Shannon died on January 9, 1998, at the age of 62. She had been diagnosed with lung cancer two weeks prior, and died during surgery to remove a tumor in Kelowna, British Columbia.

Filmography
 
 Goldwood, 1974 (director; writer; editor; music)
 I Don't Think It's Meant for Us, Challenge for Change series, 1971 (director; editor)
 It's Not Enough, Challenge for Change series, 1974 (director; editor; producer)
 Like the Trees, Challenge for Change series, 1974 (director; editor; producer)
 Luckily I Need Little Sleep, Challenge for Change series, 1974 (director; editor; producer)
 Mothers Are People, Challenge for Change series, 1974 (director; editor; producer)
 Our Dear Sisters, Challenge for Change series, 1974 (director; producer)
 The Spring and Fall of Nina Polanski, 1974 (producer; music)
 They Appreciate You More, Challenge for Change series, 1974 (director; editor; producer)
 Tiger on a Tight Leash, Challenge for Change series, 1974 (director; editor; producer)
 Would I Ever Like to Work, Challenge for Change series, 1974 (director; editor; producer)
 ...And They Lived Happily Ever After, 1975 (co-director with Irene Angelico, Anne Henderson; co-editor with Irene Angelico, Anne Henderson; producer)
 Co-op Housing: The Best Move We Ever Made, 1975 (producer)
 Co-op Housing: Getting It Together, 1975 (producer)
 Great Grand Mother, 1975 (producer)
 My Friends Call Me Tony, 1975 (producer)
 My Name Is Susan Lee, 1975 (producer)
 Just-A-Minute, 1976 (producer)
 Maud Lewis: A World Without Shadows, 1976 (producer)
 A Working Chance, 1976 (producer)
 Beautiful Lennard Island, 1977 (producer)
 Gurdeep Singh Bains, 1977 (producer)
 How They Saw Us: Needles and Pins, 1977 (producer)
 How They Saw Us: Women at War, 1977 (producer)
 How They Saw Us: Women at Work, 1977 (producer)
 Kevin Alex, 1977 (producer)
 The Lady from Grey County, 1977 (producer)
 Some American Feminists, 1977 (producer)
 Veronica, 1977 (producer)
 Benoît, 1978 (producer)
 Canada Vignettes: Flin Flon, 1978 (producer)
 Canada Vignettes: Holidays, 1978 (producer)
 Canada Vignettes: Stunt Family, 1978 (producer)
 Canada Vignettes: The Thirties, 1978 (producer)
 Eve Lambart, 1978 (producer)
 Patricia's Moving Picture, 1978 (producer)
 Rencontre, 1978 (producer)
 Sun, Wind and Wood, 1978 (producer)
 An Unremarkable Birth, 1978 (producer)
 Canada Vignettes: McIntosh, 1979 (producer)
 Prairie Album, 1979 (producer)
 The Right Candidate for Rosedale, 1979 (producer)
 Sea Dream, 1979 (producer)
 Boys Will Be Men, 1980 (producer)
 Canada Vignettes: Agnes Campbell MacPhail, 1980 (producer)
 Canada Vignettes: Birth, 1980 (producer)
 Canada Vignettes: Homestead, 1980 (producer)
 Canada Vignettes: The Vote, 1980 (producer)
 Just A Lady, 1980 (producer)
 Laila, 1980 (producer)
 Rusting World, 1980 (producer)
 The Town Mouse and the Country Mouse, 1980 (producer)
 Julie O'Brien, 1981 (producer)
 Louise Drouin: Veterinarian, 1981 (producer)
 Four Centuries: The Firearm in Canada, 1982 (producer)
 It's Just Better, 1982 (producer)
 Portrait of the Artist... as an Old Lady, 1982 (producer)
 The Way It Is, 1982 (producer)
 Attention: Women at Work, 1983 (producer)
 Dream of a Free Country: A Message from Nicaraguan Women, 1983 (director; producer)
 I Want to Be an Engineer, 1983 (producer)
 Pukaskwa National Park, 1983 (producer)
 Adèle and the Ponies of Ardmore, 1984 (producer)
 Abortion: Stories From North and South, 1984 (producer)
 Behind the Veil: Nuns, 1984 (producer)
 Head Start: Meeting the Computer Challenge, 1984 (producer)
 On Our Own, 1984 (producer)
 This Borrowed Land, 1984 (producer)
 Too Dirty for a Woman, 1984 (producer)
 The Treadmill, 1984 (producer)
 Turnaround: A Story of Recovery, 1984 (writer; co-editor with Shelly Hamer; producer)
 Waterwalker, 1984 (producer)
 The Best Time of My Life: Portraits of Women in Mid-Life, 1985 (producer)
 Dark Lullabies, 1985 (producer)
 DES: An Uncertain Legacy, 1985 (producer)
 Speaking Our Peace, 1985 (producer)
 Spirit of the Kata, 1985 (producer)
 A Writer in the Nuclear Age: A Conversation with Margaret Laurence, 1985 (producer)
 Beyond Memory, 1986 (producer)
 Children of War, 1986 (producer)
 Doctor, Lawyer, Indian Chief, 1986 (producer)
 Firewords: Louky Bersianik, Jovette Marchessault, Nicole Brossard, 1986 (producer)
 First Take Double Take, 1986 (producer)
 The Impossible Takes a Little Longer, 1986 (producer)
 Moving On, 1986 (producer)
 No Longer Silent, 1986 (producer)
 Nuclear Addiction: Dr. Rosalie Bertell on the Cost of Deterrence, 1986 (producer)
 A Safe Distance, 1986 (producer)
 Speaking of Nairobi, 1986 (producer)
 Sylvie's Story, 1986 (producer)
 Thin Dreams, 1986 (producer)
 The Legacy of Mary McEwen, 1987 (producer)
 A Love Affair with Politics: A Portrait of Marion Dewar, 1987 (producer)
 The Man Who Stole Dreams, 1987 (producer)
 To a Safer Place, 1987 (producer)
 Worth Every Minute, 1987 (producer)
 15th Anniversary, 1989 (narrator)
 Adam's World, 1989 (producer)
 Goddess Remembered, 1989 (producer)
 Illuminated Lives: A Brief History of Women's Work in the Middle Ages, 1989 (producer)
 Russian Diary, 1989 (producer)
 The Burning Times, 1990 (producer)
 Gathering Together, Faithful Women series, 1990 (director; co-editor with Gerry Rogers)
 Harmony and Balance, Faithful Women series, 1990 (director; co-editor with Gerry Rogers)
 I'll Never Forget You, Faithful Women series, 1990 (director; co-editor with Gerry Rogers)
 Priorities and Perspectives, Faithful Women series, 1990 (director; co-editor with Gerry Rogers)
 Texts and Contexts, Faithful Women series, 1990 (director; co-editor with Gerry Rogers)
 Through Ignorance or Design, Faithful Women series, 1990 (director; co-editor with Gerry Rogers)
 Working towards Peace, Faithful Women series, 1990 (director; editor)
 Full Circle, 1993 (producer)
Kathleen Shannon: On Film, Feminism & Other Dreams, 1997 (Featured; co-composer with Larry Crosley)

References

Canadian women film directors
Canadian documentary film directors
National Film Board of Canada people
Deaths from lung cancer
Canadian documentary film producers
1935 births
1998 deaths
Members of the Order of Canada
Film directors from Vancouver
Canadian feminists
Canadian film editors
Canadian women film producers
Canadian women film editors
Canadian women documentary filmmakers